Helanthium zombiense is a species of plants in the Alismataceae. It is native to the islands of Jamaica and Guadeloupe in the West Indies.

References

Alismataceae
Flora of the Caribbean
Flora of Jamaica
Flora of the Leeward Islands
Aquatic plants
Plants described in 2001
Flora without expected TNC conservation status